The 2012 Kvalserien was the 38th Kvalserien, which was played between 15 March 2012 and 6 April 2012. It determined which two teams of the participating ones would play in the 2012–13 Elitserien season and which four teams would play in the 2012–13 HockeyAllsvenskan season.

The 12th-seeded Elitserien team Timrå IK defended its spot in the top division, and Rögle BK took over Djurgårdens IF's Elitserien spot. Rögle became the first HockeyAllsvenskan playoff team in history to make one of the two Kvalserien spots for Elitserien.

Participating teams
From Elitserien (ranked 11–12)
Djurgårdens IF
Timrå IK

From HockeyAllsvenskan (ranked 1–3) 
Örebro HK
Leksands IF
BIK Karlskoga

From HockeyAllsvenskan playoff round
Rögle BK

Standings

Game log 

|-
| rowspan="3" | 1 || rowspan="3" | March 15 || Djurgårdens IF || 3–4 || Rögle BK || Hovet || 6,244
|-
| Timrå IK || 5–4 OT || BIK Karlskoga || E.ON Arena || 4,849
|-
| Örebro HK || 2–3 || Leksands IF || Behrn Arena || 4,777
|-
| rowspan="3" | 2 || rowspan="3" | March 17 || Rögle BK || 5–1 || Örebro HK || Lindab Arena || 3,769
|-
| BIK Karlskoga || 2–3 SO || Djurgårdens IF || Nobelhallen || 5,457
|-
| Leksands IF || 2–3 OT || Timrå IK || Tegera Arena || 7,650
|-
| rowspan="3" | 3 || March 19 || Djurgårdens IF || 3–1 || Leksands IF || Hovet || 8,094
|-
| rowspan="2" | March 20 || Timrå IK || 2–1 || Örebro HK || E.ON Arena || 4,882
|-
| BIK Karlskoga || 3–1 || Rögle BK || Nobelhallen || 2,652
|-
| rowspan="3" | 4 || rowspan="3" | March 22 || Örebro HK || 3–2 SO || Djurgårdens IF || Behrn Arena || 4,553
|-
| Leksands IF || 1–0 OT || BIK Karlskoga || Tegera Arena || 6,703
|-
| Rögle BK || 0–3 || Timrå IK || Lindab Arena || 4,222
|-
| rowspan="3" | 5 || rowspan="3" | March 24 || BIK Karlskoga || 3–2 || Örebro HK || Nobelhallen || 4,469
|-
| Djurgårdens IF || 2–3 || Timrå IK || Hovet || 7,651
|-
| Leksands IF || 2–5 || Rögle BK || Tegera Arena || 7,562
|-
| rowspan="3" | 6 || rowspan="3" | March 27 || Timrå IK || 3–2 || Djurgårdens IF || E.ON Arena || 5,826
|-
| Örebro HK || 3–0 || BIK Karlskoga || Behrn Arena || 3,052
|-
| Rögle BK || 5–3 || Leksands IF || Lindab Arena || 4,947
|-
| rowspan="3" | 7 || rowspan="3" | March 29 || Djurgårdens IF || 4–2 || Örebro HK || Hovet || 6,032
|-
| Timrå IK || 2–1 OT || Rögle BK || E.ON Arena || 5,096
|-
| BIK Karlskoga || 1–3 || Leksands IF || Nobelhallen || 3,347
|-
| rowspan="3" | 8 || rowspan="3" | March 31 || Örebro HK || 4–3 || Timrå IK || Behrn Arena || 2,462
|-
| Leksands IF || 2–0 || Djurgårdens IF || Tegera Arena || 7,650
|-
| Rögle BK || 5–3 || BIK Karlskoga || Lindab Arena || 4,483
|-

|-
| rowspan="3" | 9 || rowspan="3" | April 3 || Djurgårdens IF || 3–0 || BIK Karlskoga || Hovet || 3,150
|-
| Timrå IK || 4–2 || Leksands IF || E.ON Arena || 6,000
|-
| Örebro HK || 1–4 || Rögle BK || Behrn Arena || 2,063
|-
| rowspan="3" | 10 || rowspan="3" | April 6 || Leksands IF || 1–3 || Örebro HK || Tegera Arena || 5,447
|-
| BIK Karlskoga || 2–1 SO || Timrå IK || Nobelhallen || 1,846
|-
| Rögle BK || 1–2 || Djurgårdens IF || Lindab Arena || 5,048
|-

Statistics

Scoring leaders 
 
Updated as of the end of the season.
GP = Games played; G = Goals; A = Assists; Pts = Points; +/– = Plus/minus; PIM = Penalty minutes

Leading goaltenders 
These are the leaders in GAA among goaltenders who played at least 40% of the team's minutes. Updated as of the end of the season.

GP = Games played; TOI = Time on ice (minutes); GA = Goals against; SO = Shutouts; Sv% = Save percentage; GAA = Goals against average

References

External links 
Official statistics for ice hockey in Sweden
2012 Kvalserien schedule

Kvalserien
2012